The list of ship decommissionings in 1974 includes a chronological list of all ships decommissioned in 1974.


See also 

1974
 Ship decommissionings
Ship